Kobdilj is a village south of Štanjel in the Municipality of Komen in the Littoral region of Slovenia next to the border with Italy.

History
During the Second World War the village was burned by German forces.

Church
The local church is dedicated to Saint Gregory and belongs to the Parish of Štanjel.

Observatory
There is an astronomical observatory in the settlement. It was built between 2005 and 2008 and put into regular remote operation in January 2008. Most of the research time in the observatory is dedicated to monitoring variable stars.

Notable residents
Stanko Bunc (1907–1969), linguist and literary historian
Max Fabiani (1865–1962), architect
Anton Mahnič (1850–1920), Roman Catholic bishop and theologian

References

External links

Kobdilj on Geopedia

Populated places in the Municipality of Komen